KSMN may refer to:

 KSMN (TV), a television station (channel 20 analog/15 digital) licensed to Worthington, Minnesota, United States
 Lemhi County Airport (ICAO code KSMN)